Thomas Gaetano Lucchese (born Gaetano Lucchese; ; December 1, 1899 – July 13, 1967), sometimes known by the nicknames "Tommy", "Thomas Luckese", "Tommy Brown" or "Tommy Three-Finger Brown" was an Italian-American gangster and founding member of the Mafia in the United States, an offshoot of the Cosa Nostra in Sicily. From 1951 until 1967, he was the boss of the Lucchese crime family, one of the Five Families that dominate organized crime in New York City.

Early life
Lucchese was born on December 1, 1899, to Baldassarre and Francesca Lucchese in Palermo, Sicily. The surname "Lucchese" suggests family origins from the Sicilian city of Lucca Sicula. In early 1911, the Lucchese family emigrated to the United States, settling in Manhattan's Italian neighborhood of East Harlem. Lucchese's father worked hauling cement. Lucchese worked in a machine shop until 1915, when an industrial accident amputated his right thumb and forefinger.

Lucchese later married Catherine and they had two children, Frances and Baldesare. The family lived at 104 Parsons Blvd in Malba, Queens before moving in 1950 to  Lido Beach, Long Island.

107th Street gang
After his accident, Lucchese spent more time with his friends. Lucchese along with Charlie "Lucky" Luciano, formed the 107th Street gang. Members of the gang stole wallets, burglarized stores, and engaged in other hustles. The 107th Street gang operated under the protection of Bronx-East Harlem family boss Gaetano "Tom" Reina. By the age of eighteen, Lucchese had started a window washing company in East Harlem; anyone refusing to buy window washing would have their windows broken.

In 1920, Lucchese was arrested in Riverhead, Long Island, on auto theft charges. During his booking, a police officer compared Lucchese's deformed hand with that of Mordecai "Three Finger" Brown, a popular Major League Baseball pitcher. The officer nicknamed Lucchese "Three Finger Brown", an alias that Lucchese always disliked. In January 1921, Lucchese was convicted of auto theft and sentenced on March 27, 1922, to three years and nine months in prison. Lucchese served thirteen months at Sing Sing Correctional Facility before he was paroled. It would be Lucchese's only conviction.

Lucchese was released from prison in 1923, three years into prohibition. His old friends Charlie Luciano, Frank Costello, and Meyer Lansky had become partners with Jewish gangster Arnold "the Brain" Rothstein selling bootleg alcohol. During the 1920s, Lucchese became a strong ally of Luciano's and became a top member of Gaetano Reina's crime family. In August 1927, Lucchese was arrested under the alias of "Thomas Arra" and charged with receiving stolen goods. On July 18, 1928, Lucchese was arrested along with his brother-in-law, Joseph Rosato, for the murder of Louis Cerasulo; the charges were later dropped.

Castellammarese War
In early 1931, the Castellammarese War broke out between Joe Masseria and Salvatore Maranzano. In a secret deal with Maranzano, Luciano agreed to engineer the death of his boss, Masseria, in return for receiving Masseria's rackets and becoming Maranzano's second-in-command. On April 15, 1931, Luciano had lured Masseria to a meeting where he was murdered at a restaurant called Nuova Villa Tammaro on Coney Island. While they played cards, Luciano allegedly excused himself to the bathroom, with the gunmen reportedly being Vito Genovese, Albert Anastasia, Joe Adonis, and Benjamin "Bugsy" Siegel; Ciro "The Artichoke King" Terranova drove the getaway car, but legend has it that he was too shaken up to drive away and had to be shoved out of the driver's seat by Siegel. Luciano took over Masseria's family, with Genovese as his underboss.

In September 1931, Luciano and Genovese planned the murder of Salvatore Maranzano after Lucchese had previously alerted Luciano that he was marked for death, and prepared a hit team to kill Maranzano first. On September 10, 1931, when Maranzano summoned Luciano, Genovese, and Frank Costello to a meeting at his office, they knew Maranzano would kill them there. Instead, Luciano sent to Maranzano's office four Jewish gangsters whose faces were unknown to Maranzano's people. They had been secured with the aid of Lansky and Siegel. Luciano subsequently created The Commission to serve as the governing body for organized crime.

Underboss to Gagliano
Due to Luciano's reforms, the New York City underworld entered a long period of peace. Luciano was soon arrested in 1936, on compulsory prostitution charges and then deported in 1946. Tommy Gagliano would keep his family, formerly the Reina family, during a tough time, being outnumbered in the Commission by an alliance of the Bonanno, Magaddino, Profaci and Mangano families.

From 1932 onward, Gagliano kept a very low profile; almost nothing is known about him from then onward. He preferred to issue his orders through close allies, particularly Lucchese, who was his underboss and the family's public face. In 1946, Lucchese attended the mob's Havana Conference in Cuba as Gagliano's representative.

On January 25, 1943, Lucchese became a naturalized United States citizen in Newark, New Jersey.

Lucchese formed an alliance with Louis Buchalter and together they controlled the garment district.

Boss of the family

In 1951, Gagliano died of natural causes. As underboss and de facto street boss for two decades, Lucchese was the obvious successor, and the family was quickly renamed the Lucchese crime family. Lucchese appointed mobsters Stafano LaSalle as underboss and Vincenzo Rao as consigliere. That same year, Lucchese formed an alliance with Luciano crime family underboss Vito Genovese and Anastasia crime family underboss Carlo Gambino with the long-term goal of gaining control of the Commission.

Lucchese became one of the most well-respected Cosa Nostra bosses of the Post-War era. He maintained close relationships with New York City politicians, including Mayors William O'Dwyer and Vincent Impellitteri. Lucchese concentrated on the core Cosa Nostra values of making money, keeping a low public profile, and avoiding criminal prosecution. The Lucchese family came to dominate Manhattan's garment district and the related trucking industry by gaining control of key unions and trade associations.

During the 1950s, Lucchese controlled a narcotic trafficking network with Santo Trafficante Jr., the boss of the Tampa crime family. Lucchese had maintained a longtime alliance with Trafficante Jr.'s father Santo Trafficante Sr., the former boss of the Tampa mafia family and during the 1940s, helped train Trafficante Jr., in the mafia traditions. Trafficante Jr. would frequently meet with Lucchese in New York City for dinner.

Alliance with Gambino and Genovese
On November 17, 1952, U.S. Attorney General James P. McGranery initiated denaturalization proceedings against Lucchese. In its filing, the government claimed that Lucchese did not reveal his entire arrest record when applying for citizenship in the 1930s.

In 1957, Lucchese and his allies decided to attack the bosses of the Luciano and Anastasia crime families to gain Commission control. On May 3, 1957, gunman Vincent Gigante wounded Luciano's street boss Frank Costello. Shaken by the assassination attempt, Costello soon retired, leaving Genovese as boss. On October 25, 1957, Albert Anastasia was assassinated in a hotel barbershop; Carlo Gambino became the new family boss.

In 1957, Genovese called a national mob meeting to legitimize his control of the Luciano family. The meeting was held at rural home of mobster Joseph "Joe the Barber" Barbara in Apalachin, New York. On November 14, 1957, the New York State Police raided the meeting and arrested 61 fleeing gangsters. Lucchese had not yet arrived in Apalachin and therefore avoided arrest. However, his consigliere Vincenzo Rao, Gambino, Genovese and other mob leaders were detained. Genovese's humiliation motivated the new alliance of Luciano, Costello, Lansky, Gambino and Lucchese to set up Genovese's later elimination. Two years later, with the help of the alliance, Genovese was arrested on narcotics trafficking charges. Genovese was convicted and sent to prison, where he died in 1969.  With the alliance backing him, Gambino now controlled the Commission.

On April 8, 1958, the U.S. Supreme Court overturned the 1952 denaturalization ruling against Lucchese on a legal technicality. However, the next day, U.S. Attorney General William P. Rogers brought a new case against Lucchese.

Lucchese and Gambino
In 1962, Carlo Gambino's oldest son, Thomas Gambino, married Lucchese's daughter Frances. Over 1,000 guests attended the wedding, at which Carlo Gambino presented Lucchese with a $30,000 gift. In return, Lucchese gave Gambino a part of his rackets at Idlewild Airport (now called John F. Kennedy Airport). Lucchese exercised control over airport management security and all the airport unions. As a team, Lucchese and Gambino now controlled the airport, the Commission, and most organized crime in New York City.

Commission plot
In 1963, Joseph Magliocco and Bonanno boss Joseph Bonanno hatched an audacious plan to murder Commission bosses Carlo Gambino, Lucchese, and Stefano Magaddino, as well as Frank DeSimone, and take over the Mafia Commission. Joseph Magliocco gave the murder contract to Joseph Colombo. Colombo either feared for his life, or sensed an opportunity for advancement, and instead reported the plot to The Commission. The Commission, realizing that Bonanno was the real mastermind, ordered both Magliocco and Bonanno to explain. Bonanno went into hiding in Montreal, but a badly shaken Magliocco appeared and confessed everything; he was fined $50,000 and forced into retirement.

Death and burial

On July 13, 1967, Lucchese died of a brain tumor at his home in the Lido Beach area of Long Island. The funeral service was held at Our Lady of the Miraculous Medal Church in Point Lookout, New York. Lucchese is buried at Calvary Cemetery in Queens, New York. Over 1,000 mourners, including politicians, judges, policemen, racketeers, drug pushers, pimps, and hitmen attended the ceremony. Undercover policemen photographed the attendees.  At the time of his death, he had not spent a day in prison in 44 years.

Lucchese's first choice as a successor had been Antonio "Tony Ducks" Corallo, but Corallo was in prison when Lucchese died. Lucchese's second choice, Ettore Coco, was also in legal trouble and served a short time as boss. Another possible candidate was consigliere Vincenzo Rao, but he too was dealing with criminal charges. The Commission finally selected capo Carmine Tramunti as temporary acting boss until Corallo was released from prison.

In popular culture
In the television miniseries The Gangster Chronicles, Lucchese is portrayed by Jon Polito
In Gangster Wars (1981), Lucchese is portrayed by Jon Polito

 He is portrayed by Michael Rispoli on the 2022 TV series The Offer.
He is portrayed by Bo Dietl on the Epix TV Series Godfather of Harlem

Notes

Sources

Bureau of Narcotics, Sam Giancana, United States Treasury Department. Mafia: The Government's Secret File on Organized Crime. Skyhorse Publishing, 2009.

Further reading

Tommy Lucchese, the quiet don in Malba by Ron Marzlock (November 23, 2011) Queens Chronicle
A Death in the Family by Thom L. Jones. Real deal mafia.com

External links
Mobsters: Tommy Lucchese

 

1899 births
1967 deaths
Italian emigrants to the United States
American crime bosses
Prohibition-era gangsters
American gangsters of Sicilian descent
Bosses of the Lucchese crime family
Burials at Calvary Cemetery (Queens)
Criminals from New York City
Deaths from brain cancer in the United States
People from Lido Beach, New York
People with acquired American citizenship
People from East Harlem